The Shire of Wimmera was a local government area in the Wimmera region of western Victoria, Australia. Although its shire offices were located in Horsham, Horsham itself was governed by a separate council after it succeeded in 1882.

History

The Wimmera road district was incorporated on 3 March 1862, and this district became a shire on 4 March 1864. It was originally a very large district, including a significant portion of Walpeup, plus Arapiles, Dimboola, Dunmunkle, Kaniva, Kowree and Lowan, centred on the town of Horsham. By 1900, all of these areas had severed and separately incorporated, and Wimmera's boundaries remained largely unchanged for over 90 years.

On 20 January 1995, the Shire of Wimmera was abolished, and along with the City of Horsham and parts of the Shires of Arapiles and Kowree, was merged into the newly created Rural City of Horsham. The section within the Grampians National Park was transferred to the newly created Shire of Northern Grampians, whilst the Kewell West and Wallup districts were transferred to the newly created Shire of Yarriambiack.

Wards

Wimmera was divided into four ridings, each of which elected three councillors:
 North Riding
 South Riding
 East Riding
 West Riding

Towns and localities

 Ailsa
 Blackheath
 Byrneville
 Cannum
 Dadswells Bridge
 Dahlen
 Dooen
 Jung
 Kalkee
 Kewell
 Longerenong
 McKenzie Creek
 Murra Warra
 Pimpinio
 Quantong
 Riverside
 St Helens Plains
 Vectis
 Wail

Population

* Estimates in 1958, 1983 and 1988 Victorian Year Books.

References

External links
 Victorian Places - Wimmera Shire

Wimmera